Vacuolar protein-sorting-associated protein 25 is a protein that in humans is encoded by the VPS25 gene.

It is a component of the endosome-associated complex ESCRT-II (Endosomal Sorting Complexes Required for Transport protein II). ESCRT (ESCRT-I, -II, -III) complexes orchestrate efficient sorting of ubiquitinated transmembrane receptors to lysosomes via multivesicular bodies (MVBs). ESCRT-II recruits the transport machinery for protein sorting at MVB. In addition, the human ESCRT-II has been shown to form a complex with RNA polymerase II elongation factor ELL in order to exert transcriptional control activity. ESCRT-II transiently associates with the endosomal membrane and thereby initiates the formation of ESCRT-III, a membrane-associated protein complex that functions immediately downstream of ESCRT-II during sorting of MVB cargo. ESCRT-II in turn functions downstream of ESCRT-I, a protein complex that binds to ubiquitinated endosomal cargo.

ESCRT-II is a trilobal complex composed of two copies of vps25, one copy of vps22 and the C-terminal region of vps36. The crystal structure of vps25 revealed two winged-helix domains, the N-terminal domain of vps25 interacting with vps22 and vps36.

References

Further reading

Protein families